Pachydota saduca is a moth of the family Erebidae. It was described by Herbert Druce in 1895. It is found in Costa Rica, Colombia and Bolivia.

References

Phaegopterina
Moths described in 1895